Houdeng-Aimeries is a village of Wallonia and a district of the municipality of La Louvière, located in the province of Hainaut, Belgium. 

The village contains two UNESCO World Heritage sites; its 16.93 m high boat lift was listed in 1998, together with the other three hydraulic boat lifts on the Canal du Centre near La Louvière, and Bois-du-Luc is a former coal mine today preserved as one of the four Walloon mining sites listed in 2012 under the Major Mining Sites of Wallonia.

References

Former municipalities of Hainaut (province)
La Louvière